Sector 2 is an administrative unit of Bucharest.

Demographics

Sector 2 is the city's most multicultural sector. In particular, it contains Romania's largest community of Chinese people, who mainly live in the districts of Colentina and Obor.

Economy
Air Bucharest has its head office in Sector 2.

Boroughs
Colentina
Floreasca
Iancului
Moșilor
Obor
Pantelimon

Tei

Politics 

The mayor of the 2nd district (RO Sector 2) is Radu Mihaiu, member of the USR-PLUS Alliance, elected in 2020 for a four-year term. The Local Council of Sector 2 has 27 seats, with the following party composition (as of 2020):

Notes

External links

 Sector 2 

Sectors of Bucharest